Fluorosulfite is an ion with the formula SO2F−. The term is also used for compounds or salts containing this group.  Fluorosulfite was discovered in 1953 by F Seel and H Meier.

Organic compounds with the name "fluorosulfite" contain the group -OS(O)F.

Preparation 
[((CH3)2N)3SO][SO2F] can be prepared from OSF4 and Me3SiNMe2. Alkali metal fluorosulfites can be made by soaking the metal fluoride in liquid sulfur dioxide for a few days. β-CsSO2F converts to α-CsSO2F when heated to 110 °C for a couple of days but remains stable below 50 °C.

Properties 
The fluorosulfite ion is tetrahedral, with sulfur at the top. The oxygen to sulfur bonds are 147.8 pm and the fluorine to sulfur bond is >169.0 pm long. In solid ionic fluorosulfites, the ion is not fixed in orientation and continuously turns around resulting in dynamic disorder. At room temperature this turning rate is from 2×105 to 107 Hz. When cooled the rate of rotation slows, and can be frozen in place, resulting in static disorder.

Fluorosulfite is isoelectronic with chloryl fluoride (ClO2F) and in compounds it resembles chlorate (ClO3−).

The heat of formation from fluoride (F−) and sulfur dioxide (SO2) is 50 kcal mol−1.

Reactions
Fluorosulfites can react with chlorophosphazenes to make fluorophosphazenes:

(NPCl2)n + 2n KSO2F → (NPF2)n + 2n KCl + 2nSO2 n=3 or 4

Related 
Fluorosulfite is in the category of halosulfite ions which include chlorosulfite, bromosulfite and iodosulfite. Related ions include cyanosulfite SO2CN−.

List

References

Sulfites
Fluorine compounds